Joël Claude Mpah Dooh, born in Nkongsamba (Cameroon) in 1954, is a visual artist who lives and works in Douala.

Biography

Joël Claude Mpah Dooh is a graduate of the Conservatoire Municipal des Beaux-Arts of Amiens (France).

His first works on canvas offer filiform characters in postures expressing pain and seeking deliverance. His later works became very urban writings, similar to graffiti. His experiments led him to work in three dimensions, volume representing the characters of his first paintings, interpreting the poverty of amorphous people left to themselves. He works with other materials such as aluminum foil, which he paints and scratches, or Plexiglas sheets, also scratched up, which with light creates games of shadows.

In terms of public art, he is the author of one of the four works outside of the series Art’venture, offered by doual’art to the city of Douala in 1992. During this workshop with computer-aided graphic design, he met the “dean” of Cameroonian artists Koko Komégné, whom he befriended and cofounded the collective Kheops Club in 1994. Joel Mpah Dooh was also one of the artists invited to Scénographies Urbaines de Douala in 2002. He has participated in several collective and individual exhibitions, which brought him to Nigeria, South Africa, Senegal, the United States, Cuba, Lebanon and France. In 2007, he was invited by the Fondation Blachère à Apt (France) to inaugurate the residency series Art et entreprise.

Expositions

2008
 After taste, solo exhibition, Afronova Gallery, Johannesburg (Sudafrica)
 Joburg scene, thee-man show, Bag Factory, Johannesburg
 As you like it, group show, Johannesburg Art Fair, Sandton Convention Center, Johannesburg

2007
 Eclipse, solo exhibition, Maisons Follies, Maubeuge (Francia)
 Eclipse, solo exhibition, Fondation Jean Paul Blachère, Apt (Francia)
 Ba Mama, two man show with Goddy Leye, Bonendale, Douala
 Pistes africaines, solo exhibition, Les Chantiers de la Lune, La Seyne sur Mer (Francia)

2006
 Just to say hello..., solo exhibition, Afronova Gallery, Johannesburg
 Rendez-vous, solo exhibition, Mam Gallery, Douala
 Reves croisees, group show, Ateliers des Tanneurs, Brussels (Belgio)

2005
 Sans Titre, solo exhibition, Théâtre de la ville en bois, La Rochelle (Francia)
 Les galeries plastiques itinérantes, Ouagadougou, Bamako, Lome, Niamey, Accra, Dakar
 Group show, Intemporel Gallery, Parigi
 National Black Fine Art Show, solo exhibition, Noël Gallery, New York

2004
 Sans Titre, solo exhibition, Noël Gallery, Charlotte (U.S.A.)
 Moi est un autre, solo exhibition, Mam Gallery, Douala
 Group show, McColl Center for Visual Art, Charlotte
 Group show, Dakar Biennale, Atiss Gallery, Dakar
 Animismes, group show, Da Vinci Gallery, Nice

2003
 Sans Titre, solo exhibition, Maison Française de Nairobi
 Recto-Verso, solo exhibition, Mam Gallery, Douala
 Scénographie Urbaine, group show, Mam Gallery, Douala

2002
 Djé Mo-Yé, solo exhibition, Mam Gallery, Douala, Group show, Dakar Biennale, Atiss Gallery, Dakar

2001
 Voyage a travers le rêve et la mémoire, solo exhibition, National Museum, Yaoundé
 Lines of Connection, group show, Mam Gallery, Douala

2000
 Group show, 7th Havana Biennale, Havana
 L'Afrique a Jour, Ten years of Dakar Biennale, group show, Lille (Francia)

1999
 Sans Titre, solo exhibition, Mam Gallery, Douala

1998
 Couleurs du Cameroun, solo exhibition, Le Nautilus, Nantes
 Nanga Def, solo exhibition, Musée d'Art Africain de l'IFAN, Dakar

1997
 Les couleurs de la différence, two-man show, Mam Gallery, Douala

References

Bibliography
 Gallery Momo. Joël Mpah Dooh. 
 Africa 24. LE MAG - Joël MPAH DOOH – Cameroun. 
 Manga, L. (2008). L'ivresse du papillon. 1st ed. Servoz: Edimontagne, pp. 86–99.
 Pensa, Iolanda (Ed.) 2017. Public Art in Africa. Art et transformations urbaines à Douala /// Art and Urban Transformations in Douala. Genève: Metis Presses.

See also 
 List of public art in Douala
 Contemporary African art
 African art

1956 births
Living people
Cameroonian painters
Cameroonian contemporary artists
People from Nkongsamba